QMS may refer to:
 Quadrupole mass spectrometer, a scientific instrument
 Quality management system
 Quality Meat Scotland
 Quality Micro Systems, a company founded in 1979 and merged with Minolta's printer division in 2000
 
 Minolta-QMS, a printer company merged into Konica Minolta in 2003
 Quantitative Micro Software, a company who developed the EViews software
 Quartermaster Sergeant, a type of appointment in the British Army and Royal Marines
 Queue management system
 Quick Media Switching in HDMI
 Quicksilver Messenger Service, an American psychedelic rock band of the 1960s
 Quota Management System, a method of regulating catch in a fishery

 Schools
 Qualters Middle School, a grade 6-8 middle school located in Mansfield, Massachusetts
 Queensborough Middle School, a school in Queensborough, New Westminster, British Columbia, Canada
 Queen Margaret's School, a private boarding school/Day School, located in Duncan, British Columbia, Canada
 Quest Middle School, another name for IDEA Quest located in Edinburg, Texas
 Quinte Mohawk School, a primary school in Tyendinaga, Ontario